Topea is a genus of flowering plants belonging to the family Apocynaceae.

Its native range is Northeastern Argentina.

Species:
 Topea micrantha (H.A.Keller) H.A.Keller 
 Topea patens (H.A.Keller) H.A.Keller

References

Apocynaceae
Apocynaceae genera